Echostage is a music venue located in Washington, D.C.

Opened in 2012, the hybrid nightclub and concert hall has over 30,000 square feet of space and is capable of hosting up to 3,000 guests. At its inception it was the largest nightlife concert venue in Washington DC, but was eclipsed by the 6,000 person capacity at Anthem DC in 2017. The club is a venue for EDM and other dance music with performances by bands and DJs, including Lorde, Tiësto, Avicii, Calvin Harris, Disclosure, Hardwell, David Guetta, and others. Events at the venue are managed by Club Glow, which in 2015 also opened a smaller EDM venue called Soundcheck located Downtown.

In 2020, Echostage was acquired, along with Club Glow and sister club Soundcheck, by Insomniac, an electronic music event promotion company. In 2021, Echostage was voted the number one club in the world by DJ Magazine's annual "Top 100 Clubs" reader's poll, after the club had already held a place in the top ten in this ranking in previous years.

Awards and nominations

DJ Magazine's top 100 Clubs

References

Music venues completed in 2001
Nightclubs in Washington, D.C.
Electronic dance music venues
Music venues in Washington, D.C.